Jessica Tan Soon Neo (born 28 May 1966) is a Singaporean politician who has been serving as Deputy Speaker of the Parliament of Singapore since 2020. A member of the governing People's Action Party (PAP), she has been the Member of Parliament (MP) representing the Changi–Simei division of East Coast GRC since 2006.

Education
Tan attended Convent of Our Lady of Good Counsel, St. Joseph's Convent and Catholic Junior College before graduating from the National University of Singapore with a Bachelor of Social Science degree with honours in economics and a Bachelor of Arts degree in sociology.

Political career 
Tan made her political debut in the 2006 general election when she joined a five-member People's Action Party team contesting in East Coast GRC. After the PAP team won with 63.86% of the vote against the Workers' Party, Tan became a Member of Parliament representing the Changi-Simei ward of East Coast GRC.

Since then, Tan has retained her parliamentary seat in the subsequent general elections in 2011, 2015 and 2020 after the PAP team in East Coast GRC won with 54.83%, 60.73% and 53.41% of the vote in these three general elections against the Workers' Party.

On 31 August 2020, Tan and Christopher de Souza were elected as Deputy Speakers of Parliament.

Personal life
Tan is a Roman Catholic.

References

External links
 Jessica Tan on Parliament of Singapore

1966 births
Living people
Singaporean people of Chinese descent
Members of the Parliament of Singapore
People's Action Party politicians
National University of Singapore alumni
Catholic Junior College alumni
Singaporean women in politics
Singaporean Roman Catholics
Women legislative deputy speakers